"Mambo Baby" is a 1954 single written by Charles Singleton and Rose Marie McCoy and performed by Ruth Brown and Her Rhythmmakers. The single was Ruth Brown's last number one on the R&B chart, where it spent one week.

References
 

1954 singles
Ruth Brown songs
Songs written by Rose Marie McCoy